JRC is a three-letter abbreviation with multiple meanings, as described below:

The hepatitis B and liver cancer awareness campaign Jade Ribbon Campaign 
The media corporation Journal Register Company 
Johnson Reprint Corporation, a reprint publisher by Walter J. Johnson aka Walter Jolowicz
The Joint Radio Company of the fuel and power industries in the United Kingdom.
The European Commission Joint Research Centre (JRC)
Japanese Red Cross
Radio communication equipment manufacturer Japan Radio Co., Ltd.
Radio control devices manufacturer Japan Remote Control
Jose Rizal College, now Jose Rizal University of Mandaluyong, Philippines
The Judge Rotenberg Educational Center
 Royal Court of Jersey
 Junior Rally Championship, formerly known as Junior World Rally Championship prior to 2007